Benefactor may refer to:

 Benefactor (album), a 1982 album by Romeo Void
 Benefactor (law) for a person whose actions benefit another or a person that gives back to others
 Benefication (metallurgy) in extractive metallurgy
 Benefactors (play), a 1984 play
 Benefactor (video game), a 1994 video game
 The Benefactor (TV series), a 2004 reality TV series
 The Benefactor (2015 film), a 2015 film
 The Benefactor (1942 film), a 1942 French drama film

See also
A Malefactor
Malefactor, Ade